Crimea, or the Crimean Peninsula, historically also known as the Tauric Chersonese (Tauric Peninsula, Tauric, Taurica, or Tauris), is a major peninsula in the north of the Black Sea.

Crimea may also refer to:

Places

Crimean Peninsula

Current
Autonomous Republic of Crimea, a republic of Ukraine invaded and annexed by Russia in 2014
Republic of Crimea, a federal subject of Russia, internationally recognized as Ukrainian territory occupied by Russia

Historical
Roman Crimea (47 BCE – c. 340 CE)
Crimean Khanate (1441–1783) 
Taurida Governorate (1802–1917), in the Russian Empire
During the Russian Civil War:
Crimean People's Republic (1917–1918)  
Taurida Soviet Socialist Republic (1918) 
Crimean Regional Government (1918–1919) 
Crimean Socialist Soviet Republic (1919)
Crimean Autonomous Soviet Socialist Republic (1921–1945), in the RSFSR
Crimea-Taurida, part of the Reichskommissariat Ukraine when Nazi Germany occupied the country in WWII
Crimean Oblast (1945–1991) within the Soviet Union
Crimean Autonomous Soviet Socialist Republic (1991–1992), in Ukraine
Republic of Crimea (1992-1995)
Crimean Federal District (2014–2016), a federal district of Russia
Republic of Crimea (country), a short-lived country existing in March 2014

Elsewhere
Crimea, Louisiana, an unincorporated community in Tensas Parish, Louisiana, United States
Crimea, Virginia, an unincorporated community in Dinwiddie County, Virginia, United States
Crimea, Queensland, a locality in Australia
1140 Crimea, a main-belt asteroid
Crimea Pass, a mountain pass in north Wales

Other uses
Crimea, a fictional country in the video games Fire Emblem: Path of Radiance and Fire Emblem: Radiant Dawn
Crimea Air, a defunct airline
History of Crimea, the recorded history of the Crimean Peninsula, begins around the 5th century BC when several Greek colonies were established along its coast
Crimea: The Dawn of Modern Warfare, a 1975 board wargame that simulates the Crimean War 1853–1856

See also

 Crimea Medal (disambiguation)
 Crimean War (disambiguation)
 Republic of Crimea (disambiguation)
 Russian Crimea (disambiguation)
 
Chimera (disambiguation)
Krim (disambiguation)
Krym (disambiguation)
Krymsky (disambiguation)
Stary Krym, the city eponymous of the name of the peninsula